The Da Ponte operas, or Mozart–Da Ponte trilogy, are the three operas composed by Wolfgang Amadeus Mozart based on libretti by Lorenzo da Ponte:

 The Marriage of Figaro (1786);
 Don Giovanni (1787);
  (1790).

Despite the light and comic character implied by the genre, they express an aspiration to freedom inspired by the ideals of the Age of Enlightenment and deal with themes which were daring for their time, especially with regards to religion (Don Giovanni), politics (Marriage), and morality. Other common topics include the search for love or for sexual pleasure, disguise (especially transvestism) and the ensuing mistaken identities, the harassment of women by men, and the conflicts between master and servant.

Productions as a cycle 

Although the three operas were designed by Mozart and Da Ponte as completely separate, some stage directors endeavoured to produce them as a single story, in order to stress the continuities and echoes between them:

 In 2015–2017, French director Ivan Alexandre produced the trilogy at the Drottningholm Palace Theatre and the Royal Opera of Versailles, with subsequent performances on tour. Figaro and Leporello, both servants, are performed by the same singer, as they had been by Francesco Benucci in 1786–1787. Musical quotations are added from the other operas, as Mozart himself had done when Don Giovanni’s house orchestra plays the popular tune of Figaro’s aria.

 In 2020, Jean-Philippe Clarac and Olivier Delœil produced a cycle commissioned by Peter de Caluwe at the Royal Theatre of La Monnaie, Brussels. The three works are performed in a single set, a three-level open and rotating building inspired by Georges Perec’s Life: A User's Manual, making it easier to interweave three libretti in a single twenty-four hour story. Twelve singers each played two of the twenty-five roles (for example Almaviva and Don Giovanni, the Countess and Donna Anna, or Cherubino and Dorabella), and some characters from one opera had short interventions in another, for which a few lines were redistributed to them.

References

Literature 

 
 
 

!Da Ponte opera
!Da Ponte opera